USS Navajo (AT-52) was a tug built in 1907 by Neafie & Levy, Philadelphia, Pennsylvania, purchased by the United States Navy on 21 November 1907 and commissioned on 17 March 1908 as Fleet Tug No.52.

Pacific Ocean operations 
Assigned to Pearl Harbor, Navajo operated in the Hawaiian Islands throughout her Naval career, performing towing and docking operations. On 17 July 1920 she was reclassified as AT-52.

In 1922, Water Barge #10, while in tow by Navajo, collided with the submarine . With a hole in her bow, the barge sank within minutes. The gallant action of men from Navajo resulted in rescue of the barge's three-man crew. After decommissioning, Navajo was struck from the Navy List on 24 April 1937.

Restored to duty 
Navajo was restored to the list as IX–56 on 14 January 1942, and she served in a decommissioned status at the Navy Yard at Pearl Harbor. She was placed in service on 15 March 1942 and continued operations in the 14th Naval District throughout World War II.
 
After war-time service she was struck from the Navy List on 9 February 1946. She was subsequently sold for scrap to Commercial Equipment Co. on 23 November 1948.

Awards 
World War I Victory Medal
Asiatic-Pacific Campaign Medal
World War II Victory Medal

References

External links 
 
 ZC (Ship) Files in the Navy Department Library
 Twelfth, Thirteenth, and Fourteenth Naval Districts, 1923

Ships built by Neafie and Levy
Tugs of the United States Navy
1907 ships